The Hemrin Dam is a dam on the Diyala River 100 km northeast of Baghdad, Iraq. The main purpose of the dam is flood control, irrigation and hydroelectric generation. Its power station has a 50 MW capacity. The dam and the attached power house were built in years 1976-1981 by the then Yugoslav company GIK Hidrogradnja (of Sarajevo, now Bosnia-Herzegovina). All the equipment (gates, turbines, generators) were also supplied by the then-Yugoslav companies.

A large archaeological salvage operation was undertaken to excavate archaeological sites that were at risk of flooding once the reservoir (now Hamrin Lake) would start to fill. Sites that were excavated as part of this operation included Tell Madhur, Tell Rashid, Tell Saadiya and Tell Abada.

See also

 List of dams and reservoirs in Iraq
 List of power stations in Iraq

References

External links

Dams in Iraq
Hydroelectric power stations in Iraq
Earth-filled dams
Dams completed in 1981
Dams on the Diyala (Sirwan) River
1981 establishments in Iraq
Energy infrastructure completed in 1981